David Fuster Torrijos (born 3 February 1982) is a Spanish retired professional footballer who played as an attacking midfielder.

After starting out at Villarreal B – he also represented the first team in the 2009–10 season – he went on to spend most of his professional career at Olympiacos, appearing in more than 150 competitive matches and win nine major titles, including six consecutive national championships.

Club career

Villarreal and Elche
Fuster was born in Oliva, Valencia. Aged already 22 he was signed from his hometown club by Villarreal CF, but spent four years exclusively with its reserves, helping the team promote to the third division in 2007.

In 2008, Fuster was sold to neighbours Elche CF, with an option to rebuy afterwards. After a solid 2008–09 season in the second level – he was the club's topscorer at 13, tied for tenth in the league – he was rebought by Villarreal for a mere €500.000. He received relative amount of playing time in his debut year, scoring his first goal for the club in the 3–2 away defeat against Sevilla on 8 November 2009; on 2 January 2010 he added another, in the club's 1–1 draw at La Liga and UEFA Champions League champions Barcelona.

Olympiacos
In late August 2010, 28-year-old Fuster signed for Olympiacos F.C. in Greece for the amount of €1.5 million, rejoining former Villarreal acquaintances Ariel Ibagaza and Ernesto Valverde (manager). In his first season he won the league and reached the quarter-finals in the domestic cup, ranking third in the goal scorers' chart and leading the team in minutes played.

On 28 September 2011, Fuster scored his first goal in the Champions League, in a 2–1 away defeat against Arsenal. He also netted in the second game between the two sides (3–1 home win), as the Piraeus team finished third in their group, being relegated to the UEFA Europa League; in the latter competition his second-half strike gave his team a 1–0 away win over Rubin Kazan in the round of 32 (eventually 2–0 on aggregate). In the next round he repeated the feat against Metalist Kharkiv, who however won the second leg 2–1 in Athens to progress, with the player featuring the 90 minutes and finishing as club top scorer in the tournament with four goals.

On 28 April 2012, in the 119th minute of the final of the Greek Cup, Fuster scored from a Vasilis Torosidis assist for the 2–1 winner against Atromitos, after having come on as a late substitute. During the 2012–13 campaign, as Leonardo Jardim was at the helm of the team, he suffered a dip in form, also being injured for two months; when he returned, however, Jardim's replacement Míchel showed confidence in his compatriot.
 		
On 7 April 2013, Fuster scored his third and last goal in the season, contributing to a 4–0 success at Platanias as Olympiacos won its third national championship in a row. On 15 March of the following year he netted another, with his team downing Panthrakikos 2–0 at home and renewing its domestic supremacy.

After a successful 2014–15, which ended with double conquest, 33-year-old Fuster eventually extended his contract for a further two years. His renewal was also a satisfaction for his former coach Ernesto Valverde, who mentioned "Fuster is a perfect player for the club because of the similarities in character. I am also proud for the club because I love it, and I want it to have the best players".

On 2 September 2015, Fuster was left out of newly appointed manager Marco Silva's Champions League squad. He appeared rarely during the season  but, on 28 February 2016, helped with a brace to a 3–0 home win against Veria that confirmed Olympiacos' 43rd national championship. 

On 15 June 2016, Fuster announced on social media that his contract would not be renewed.

Getafe
On 4 July 2016, Fuster signed a one-year deal with Getafe CF. His only goal during the season came on 17 June 2017 in the promotion play-offs, when he came from the bench to help the hosts defeat Huesca 3–0 (5–2 on aggregate).

On 25 June 2017, after finally achieving promotion to the top tier, 35-year-old Fuster announced his retirement.

Career statistics

Honours
Olympiacos
Super League Greece: 2010–11, 2011–12, 2012–13, 2013–14, 2014–15, 2015–16
Greek Football Cup: 2011–12, 2012–13, 2014–15

References

External links

1982 births
Living people
People from Safor
Sportspeople from the Province of Valencia
Spanish footballers
Footballers from the Valencian Community
Association football midfielders
La Liga players
Segunda División players
Segunda División B players
Tercera División players
Villarreal CF B players
Villarreal CF players
Elche CF players
Getafe CF footballers
Super League Greece players
Olympiacos F.C. players
Spanish expatriate footballers
Expatriate footballers in Greece
Spanish expatriate sportspeople in Greece